Lovell Pinkney (born August 18, 1972) is a former American football tight end who played one season with the St. Louis Rams of the National Football League (NFL). He was drafted by the Rams in the fourth round of the 1995 NFL Draft. He played college football at the University of Texas at Austin and attended Anacostia High School in Washington, D.C. Pinkney was also a member of the Grand Rapids Rampage of the Arena Football League.

References

External links
Just Sports Stats
College stats

Living people
1972 births
Players of American football from Washington, D.C.
American football tight ends
American football wide receivers
African-American players of American football
Texas Longhorns football players
St. Louis Rams players
Grand Rapids Rampage players
People from Southeast (Washington, D.C.)
21st-century African-American sportspeople
20th-century African-American sportspeople